Bernard Edward Howard, 12th Duke of Norfolk,  (21 November 1765 – 16 March 1842) was a British peer.

Early life
Howard was the son of Henry Howard (1713–1787) by his wife Juliana Molyneux, daughter of Sir William Molyneux, 6th Baronet (died 1781), of Teversall, Nottinghamshire, High Sheriff of Nottinghamshire 1737.

Career
Bernard Howard succeeded to the title of Duke of Norfolk in 1815 upon the death of his cousin Charles Howard, 11th Duke of Norfolk.

An ardent Roman Catholic, like most of his family, he strongly supported Catholic Emancipation, and gave offence to his Protestant neighbours by giving a banquet to celebrate the passage of the Roman Catholic Relief Act 1829.

He was elected a Foreign Honorary Member of the American Academy of Arts and Sciences in 1803. In 1834, the Duke of Norfolk was invested by King William IV into the Order of the Garter.

Personal life
On 23 April 1789, he married Lady Elizabeth Belasyse (1770–1819), daughter of Henry Belasyse, 2nd Earl Fauconberg and the former Charlotte Lamb. Before the couple divorced five years later in May 1794, they were the parents of:

 Henry Howard, 13th Duke of Norfolk (1791–1856), who married Lady Charlotte Sophia Leveson-Gower (1788–1870), who was the eldest daughter of George Leveson-Gower, 1st Duke of Sutherland and Lady Elizabeth Sutherland, suo jure Countess of Sutherland (only daughter of William Sutherland, 18th Earl of Sutherland). She served as Lady of the Bedchamber from 1842 to 1843.

He died in 1842 at the age of 76. Upon his death, his only son, Henry, became the 13th Duke of Norfolk. He is buried in Fitzalan Chapel at Arundel Castle.

Family

Ancestry

Family tree

References 

|-

Norfolk, Bernard Howard, 12th Duke of
Norfolk, Bernard Howard, 12th Duke of
English Roman Catholics
Garter Knights appointed by William IV
Norfolk, Bernard Howard, 12th Duke of
312
30
306
10th Earl of Norfolk
20
Bernard Howard, 12th Duke of Norfolk
Fellows of the American Academy of Arts and Sciences
Fellows of the Royal Society
Members of the Privy Council of the United Kingdom